Francesco Carradori (1747-1824) was an Italian sculptor in Florence.

He initially studied in his native Pistoia, under Innocenzo Spinazzi. Later, the patronage of the then Grand Duke Leopold sustained him as a pupil of Agostino Penna in Rome. He became the professor of sculpture at the Royal Academy of Fine Arts in Florence. In 1802, he published a guide (Istruzione elementare) for students of sculpture. Among his pupils was Stefano Ricci (sculptor). It is reported that either him or his teacher may have installed the tail of the Chimera of Arezzo incorrectly, causing the Chimera's snake-tail to appear to be biting the Chimera's own goat horns.

References
 Carradori, Francesco, Lasinio, Carlo, Istruzione elementare per gli studiosi della scultura, 1802. Internet Archive

1747 births
1824 deaths
18th-century Italian sculptors
Italian male sculptors
19th-century Italian sculptors
People from Pistoia
Academic staff of the Accademia di Belle Arti di Firenze
19th-century Italian male artists
18th-century Italian male artists